Pillow Talk – Miki Sings the R&B Classics is the eighth studio album by American R&B singer Miki Howard released on September 19, 2006 under Shanachie Records label. On this album, Howard sings her interpretations of favorite R&B classic songs. It peaked at number 60 on Billboards Top R&B/Hip-Hop Albums chart.

Critical reception

AllMusic editor Andy Kellman found that even Howard's "most devout fans might feel a little shortchanged by the shortage of original material here. Howard's voice is in fine form, but she doesn't always sound inspired by the songs, and the arrangements tend to be lukewarm, whether they involve drum loops or smooth jazz stylings. The highlights include versions of Ann Peebles' "I Can't Stand the Rain" and Boz Scaggs' "Lowdown," as well as the title track."

Track listing

Notes
 "Go Away Little Boy" is a cover of Marlena Shaw's "Yu-Ma/Go Away Little Boy" from her 1977 album Sweet Beginnings.

Charts

References

2006 albums
Miki Howard albums
Covers albums
Shanachie Records albums
Disco albums by American artists